Pęcław may refer to the following places in Poland:
Pęcław, Lower Silesian Voivodeship (south-west Poland)
Pęcław, Masovian Voivodeship (east-central Poland)